Popples is a children's animated television series based on the Popples toy line produced by Saban Brands, Method Animation and Zagtoon, in co-production with Nexus Factory and Umedia, with the participation of Tiji, Gulli, and DQ Entertainment International, and in association with SOFITVCINE 2 and UFund. The series portrays the adventures of the comedic pals Bubbles, Sunny, Lulu, Izzy, and Yikes. It is an original series distributed by Netflix. The last Popples television adaptation to air was a 1986 animated series.

On May 1, 2018, Saban Brands sold Popples to Hasbro.

The series made its linear debut on Discovery Family on July 1, 2019.

Premise
Popples are depicted as an amazing species of creatures that can pop into and out of a ball. The story is driven by the optimistic comedic enthusiasm of the BPP's (Best Popple Pals): Bubbles, Sunny, Lulu, Izzy and Yikes. Always wanting to help their friends, neighbors and each other, their efforts often backfire in hilarious ways and they must spend the rest of the episode trying to unwind the mayhem they have caused. Luckily they always manage to save the day in their own POP-tastic way.

Characters

Main characters
Bubbles (voiced by Cassandra Morris)
Lulu (voiced by Cindy Robinson)
Sunny (voiced by Wendee Lee Season 1, & Erin Fitzgerald Season 2-3)
Izzy (voiced by Cindy Robinson)
Yikes (voiced by Grant George)

Supporting characters
Mike Mine (voiced by Ben Diskin)
Gruffman (voiced by Ezra Weisz)
Penny & Polly Popplar (both voiced by Reba Buhr)
Miss Shush (voiced by Karen Strassman)
Mayor Maynot (voiced by Various)
Babapop (voiced by Various)
Coach Loudly (voiced by Christopher Corey Smith)
Mrs. Snooply (voiced by Various)
HELP-R (voiced by Various)
Guest Star
 Squeaky Pop (voiced by Megan Nicole)

Episode list

Season 1
In 2014, Netflix announced that at least 26 episodes would be released. 10 episodes were planned for the first season; each episode runs for 22 minutes and consists of two segments. The episodes were released on October 30, 2015.

Season 2
The second season of Popples was released on Netflix on March 11, 2016.

Season 3
The third season of Popples were released on Netflix on July 24, 2016.

Merchandise
Saban Brands had exclusive rights to the Popples characters and had distributed a toy line through Spin Master from 2016 to 2018. Much like their earlier incarnations of the 1980s, the toys can be rolled into a ball and "popped" back out.

References

External links

Zagtoon Official Website
Voice cast

2015 American television series debuts
2016 American television series endings
2015 French television series debuts
2010s American animated television series
2010s French animated television series
American children's animated fantasy television series
American computer-animated television series
French children's animated fantasy television series
French computer-animated television series
English-language Netflix original programming
Netflix children's programming
Television series by Saban Capital Group
Animated television series by Netflix
Television series by Hasbro Studios
Television series by Method Animation